The DAR 6 was a 1930s Bulgarian two-seat basic or advanced biplane training aircraft.

Design and development
The DAR 6 was designed by Zevtan Lazarov.  It was constructed by the Bulgarian State Aircraft Workshops (DAR).

The aircraft was a conventional biplane with a fixed tailskid landing gear.  It was powered by a radial engine.

Three versions were initially developed:
Basic training version, powered by an 85 hp (63 kW) Walter Vega engine;
Advanced training version, powered by a 145 hp (108 kW) Walter Mars I engine;
1937 Model DAR 6a.  This variant offered faired struts and redesigned divided landing gear.  It was powered by a 150 hp (112 kW) Walter Mars I engine.

Operators

 Bulgarian Air Force

Specifications (DAR 6)

References

Bibliography

 The Illustrated Encyclopedia of Aircraft, (Part Work 1982–1985), Orbis Publishing, Page 1295

1930s Bulgarian military trainer aircraft
DAR 06
Biplanes
Single-engined tractor aircraft